Regent Records was an American record label in Newark, New Jersey. It was a subsidiary of Savoy from 1947 until 1964, specializing in jazz, rhythm and blues, pop, and rock and roll. The label was founded by Herman Lubinsky in 1947.

Roster
 
 Pepper Adams
 Dorothy Ashby
 Mildred Bailey
 Milt Buckner
 Donald Byrd
 Joe Carroll
 Wild Bill Davison
 Dolly Dawn
 Billy Eckstine
 Tommy Flanagan
 Curtis Fuller
 Erroll Garner
 Dizzy Gillespie
 Jorgen Ingmann (as Jergen Ingman)
 John Jenkins
 J. J. Johnson
 Mary Ann McCall
 Johnny Otis
 Ben Pollack
 Sonny Red
 Shorty Rogers
 Annie Ross
 Charlie Ventura
 Frank Wess
 Joe Williams

See also
 List of record labels
 Regent Records (disambiguation)

References

External links
Discogs entry
Regent Records on the Internet Archive's Great 78 Project

American record labels
Jazz record labels